County routes in Genesee County, New York, are not posted on route markers. However, the number is given, along with house numbers, often on intersection blade signs. There is no apparent numbering pattern.

County routes generally comprise one or more named roads, or portions thereof, strung together to form a single continuous unit. These usually extend for some distance, connecting primary highways in two or more towns. The majority of the county's roads are assigned to the towns. Nowhere does any county route wholly enter either a village or the city of Batavia.

Routes 1–25A

Routes 26–151

See also

County routes in New York
Highways in Genesee County, New York

References

External links
Genesee County Highways – Empire State Roads.com

 
County routes